The Broyhanhaus is a residential and commercial building built in 1576 in Hanover's historic old town or Altstadt. The building is standing on the cellar walls of a previous building from the 14th century and is the second oldest preserved half-timbered building in Hanover. The house is named after the brewer Cord Broyhan († 1570 in Hanover) who lived there since 1537.

Location and description 
The Broyhanhaus is located at Kramerstraße 24 in Hanover's old town. It is located in a row of historic half-timbered buildings in the immediate vicinity of the Marktkirche.

The building is a typical residential and commercial building from the early days in Hanover. The owners of the property have been stated since 1428. The majority of them were Kramer (merchants) who carried out their trade in the house. From 1537 the brewer Cord Broyhan lived in the house.

The building was examined in 1984 and then restored until 1987. Today the building is used as a restaurant on the two lower floors and in the vaulted cellar and as a residential building on the upper floors. The Broyhanhaus is listed in the list of architectural monuments.

The restaurant is well known for roast suckling pig with Sauerkraut.

Literature 
 Wolfgang Frontzek, Günther Kokkelink: Zur Baugeschichte des „Broyhanhauses“, Kramerstraße 24 in Hannover. In: Hannoversche Geschichtsblätter, Neue Folge 39 (1985), p. 135–168
 Helmut Knocke, Hugo Thielen: Hannover Kunst- und Kultur-Lexikon, Handbuch und Stadtführer, 4th edition, zu Klampen Verlag, Springe 2007; here: p. 159
 Tim Hampson: The Beer Book. Cleveland, OH 2008, p. 100
 Helmut Knocke: Broyhanhaus. In: Klaus Mlynek, Waldemar R. Röhrbein (ed.) and others: Stadtlexikon Hannover. Von den Anfängen bis in die Gegenwart. Schlütersche, Hannover 2009, ISBN 978-3-89993-662-9, p. 86

References

External links 

 
 Broyhan Haus (German)

Restaurants in Germany
Companies based in Hanover
Breweries in Germany
Companies based in Lower Saxony
Hanover